The Penta Ocean Pirates are an American football team located in Hachioji, Tokyo, Japan.  They are a member of the X-League.

Team history
2005 Team Founded as the Yasuda L.A. Pirates. Finished 4th in the East division (2 wins, 3 losses).
2006 Team renamed as the Meiji Yasuda Pirates. Finished 5th in the East division (1 win, 4 losses).
2007 Finished 4th in the Central division (2 wins, 5 losses).
2015 David Powroznilk hired as head coach. Team renamed the Meiji Yasuda Penta-Ocean Pirates. Finished 5th in the East division (1 win, 5 losses, 1 tie).
2020 Team renamed the Penta-Ocean Pirates.

Seasons

Head coaches

References

External links
  (Japanese)

American football in Japan
Meiji Yasuda Life
2005 establishments in Japan
American football teams established in 2005
X-League teams